Faristenia ussuriella is a moth in the family Gelechiidae.  It is found in the Russian Far East and Korea.

The wingspan is 14–15 mm. The forewings are greyish brown with a well-developed costal patch and with several dark fuscous streaks near the base, along the antemedial fascia and below the costal patch. The hindwings are pale grey.

The larvae feed on Quercus mongolica.

References

Faristenia
Moths described in 1991